Isaiah Katumwa is a Ugandan jazz musician saxophonist. He hosts a weekly program on Urban TV (a Ugandan popular station), called "Jazz with Isaiah".  He is credited for turning many people in Uganda into jazz enthusiasts.

Early life and education

With no music school or saxophone shop or even a teacher to start him off in Uganda, Isaiah refused circumstances to dictate his future. This was his mindset as a passionate young teenager in the early 1990s when he was given a saxophone by his guardian, an instrument he had never seen before.
This self-taught saxophonist who has stood side by side on stage with global icons like Jonathan Butler, Hugh Masekela, Jimmy Dludlu, Seweto Kinchy among many is Uganda's jazz pioneer and gem whose innovation has inspired and turned many onto jazz. He has converted many into jazz enthusiasts and has turned the genre into one the number of whose musicians and fans is growing dramatically in Uganda, and East Africa at large. African, Smooth and Divine.... these are the three words that he uses to best describe his music. 
‘’Beyond the limiting boxes and categories placed on the industry, I believe in artistic originality based on my genuine influences to express my African grooves, Smooth Jazz influence and Christian upbringing’’ says Isaiah .

Music

His experience and love for the saxophone dates back over 20 years, but he broke onto the international professional music scene eight years ago at a time wen jazz in Uganda and in east Africa did not have a significant presence on the music scene. At a time when a sole performance by an instrumentalist was unheard of or even a record in the region. In 2006, Isaiah released ‘’Sinza” album that even featured on BBC focus on Africa. This was a break through album with the mega-hit song “Sinza” that earned him wide national and international recognition. He continues in his attempt to influence the industry for quality, skills, creativity and professionalism in not only jazz but also African music. Along with the traditional folk musical background, he has developed a blend of sound to express his East African identity, smooth jazz influence and spiritual passion. You can feel his genuine African sense of gratitude and the joy he pours into his music while creating it and performing it on stage. “I am grateful that people welcome and show interest in what I have to say musically…to me that’s beautiful and miraculous. He has featured on a number of distinguished televisions that include BBC (UK), PRI (US), African magic TV, DSTV’s Studio 53 and MNET and has been nominated for a number of international awards.

He has also either shared a stage or opened performances for names like Manu Dibangu, Jonathan Butler, Hugh Masekela, Miriam Makeba, Chaka Chaka, Oliver Mtukudzi, Erikah Badu, Phil Driscoll, Alvin Slaughter, Jimmy Dludlu and many others. He endorses C.E WINDS, a US based saxophone manufacturer in Florida. He has performed in Europe- London UK, Amsterdam, Brussels, Paris, and in a couple of West and East African countries. He has also performed for heads of states frequently and so far more than 20 presidents and has performed for his Uganda’s president countless times. To him, it’s the continuous and undying support that his fans have always showed him that gives him the courage to push on even harder. Every time a huge crowd turns up, just to watch me perform, it’s a special feeling and a blessing so humbling at the same time. Watching people sing and dance to my songs that I released years back makes the whole experience fresh and gives me motivation to hold my horn tighter.

Isaiah’s passion is to see young lives changed through music and he has dedicated himself to a vision of inspiring untapped talent and potential using his personal life story: from a background of hopelessness as a child having to work for his school tuition from the tender age of 10 to the man that he now is. “If I could make it to here, then anyone else can with God. Even better” Isaiah is married to Sheila and they have a son called Mitchell.

Besides music, Isaiah has a passion to, mentor and inspire young musicians and talent which he does through “The Talanta Music Mentorship Program” that he started in February 2014.

He also carries out school career mentorship tours where he visits different schools to share his experiences, struggles, dreams and personal path to success. This has inspired thousands of young people from different secondary schools and universities.

Isaiah Katumwa hosts a television show “Jazz With Isaiah” on Urban TV (a Ugandan popular station), that he started in 2011 with an objective of discovering, educating, encouraging and celebrating talent. He features musicians that share their music journeys and as well as entertaining jazz lovers.

He also hosts a daily request radio show program “The Isaiah Katumwa Show” on 106.1 Jazz FM where he mainly plays favorite jazz tracks from the world's renowned jazz musicians as requested by the listeners

Discography
 2001 Will Worship you
 2002 Saxo Hymns
 2003 We 3 kings
 2004 Sax worship
 2005 Celebrate Africa
 2006 Sinza
 2007 Coming Home
 2009 Another Step
 2010 Sinza Too
 2011 African Smoothy

References

External links 
"Isaiah Katumwa and Racheal Namubiru talk about their song "Nzizze" 
"Jazz Maestro Isaiah Katumwa Electrifies Kampala"

Ugandan jazz musicians
21st-century Ugandan male singers
Jazz saxophonists
Living people
Kumusha
Year of birth missing (living people)
Ugandan instrumentalists
21st-century saxophonists
Male jazz musicians